St Mary's College, Blairs (commonly known as Blairs College), situated near Aberdeen in Scotland, was from 1829 to 1986 a junior seminary for boys and young men studying for the Roman Catholic priesthood. Part of the former college now houses Blairs Museum, the museum of Scotland's Catholic heritage. The New Chapel is a Category A listed building, with the other buildings listed as Category B.

History

Lying on the south bank of the River Dee, between Kirkton of Maryculter and Aberdeen, the land on which the seminary was built was originally owned by the Knights Hospitallers of St John of Jerusalem, before passing to the Menzies family in 1542. In 1827 the land was donated by John Menzies of Pitfodfels (1756-1843) to the bishops of the Roman Catholic Church in Scotland, and the original building, Menzies House, converted into a seminary for 25 pupils. In 1829, Lismore Seminary and Aquhorthies College were merged, then closed and the students moved to Blairs College.

A major expansion was executed from 1897 to 1902 with a new chapel by Robert Curran of Warrington and new lectures rooms and accommodation by Robert Gordon Wilson of Aberdeen. The new buildings were formally opened by Bishop Chisholm on 23 September 1903.

The college's book collection is housed in Aberdeen University Library, and the archives at the Scottish Catholic Archives.

The college closed in 1986, but the chapel continue to be used as a place of worship. There is a Sunday Mass in the chapel every week at 9:30am. In June 2022, it was announced that the chapel would close as a place of worship. A final decision is to be made by the end of September 2022.

The college now homes Blairs Museum, a museum of Catholic History with significant collections of art relating to Mary, Queen of Scots, the Jacobites and the history of Catholicism in Scotland. The museum is open at weekends from April to September or by appointment.

Notable former pupils

 Andrew Boyle (1919-1991), broadcaster, historian
 Robert Fraser (1858-1914) Bishop of the Roman Catholic Diocese of Dunkeld
 Sylvester McCoy, actor
 Fr. Allan MacDonald (1859-1904), priest, poet, and folklore collector in South Uist and Eriskay. A highly important figure in Scottish Gaelic literature.

Notable Staff
 Edward Douglas, Bishop of Motherwell
 Peter Moran, Bishop of Aberdeen

See also
 St. Peter's Seminary (Cardross)

References

External links
 Blairs Museum The Museum of Scotland's Catholic Heritage
 Blairs College Official website of the 'Friends of Blairs'
 Buildings at Risk Register entry
 Urban Exploration of Blairs
 Another Urban Exploration of Blairs
 A third Urban Exploration of Blairs
 Article about new development
 Site entry at National Record of the Historic Environment

Kincardine and Mearns
Religious organizations established in 1829
Educational institutions established in 1829
19th century in Scotland
Category A listed buildings in Aberdeenshire
Category B listed buildings in Aberdeenshire
Listed churches in Scotland
Churches in Aberdeenshire
Former churches in Scotland
Defunct universities and colleges in Scotland
Catholic seminaries in Scotland
1829 establishments in Scotland
Religious museums in Scotland